Hong Kong cinemas have been ordered to close by the government due to the COVID-19 from 7 January until 20 April 2022.

This article lists feature-length Hong Kong films released in 2022 after 20 April.

Box office
The highest-grossing Hong Kong films released in 2022, by domestic box office gross revenue, are as follows:

(List of 2022 box office number-one films in Hong Kong)

Releases

See also
 2022 in Hong Kong
 List of 2022 box office number-one films in Hong Kong
 List of Hong Kong films of 2021
 List of Hong Kong films of 2023

References

External links

 IMDb list of Hong Kong films 

2022
Films
Hong Kong
Hong Kong
Hong Kong film-related lists